Elizabeth Hervey, Countess of Bristol (18 December 1676 – 1 May 1741), was a British court official and noble, the second wife of John Hervey, 1st Earl of Bristol. They had seventeen children.

She was the daughter of Sir Thomas Felton, 4th Baronet, and his wife, the former Lady Elizabeth Howard. She married Hervey on 25 July 1695 at Boxted Hall in Suffolk, and became Countess of Bristol when her husband acquired the earldom in October 1714.

The children of the marriage were:

 John Hervey, 2nd Baron Hervey (1696–1743), politician, court wit and pamphleteer
 Lady Elizabeth Hervey (1698–1727), married Hon. Bussy Mansel, and had no children
 Hon. Thomas Hervey (20 January 1699 – 16 January 1775), MP for Bury from 1733 to 1747; held various offices at court; he eloped with Elizabeth, wife of  Sir Thomas Hanmer, 4th Baronet. 
 Capt. Hon. William Hervey, RN (25 December 1699 – January 1776), who married Elizabeth Ridge and had issue
 Rev. Hon. Henry Hervey (5 January 1701 – 16 November 1748), who married Catherine Aston, assumed her surname, and had issue
 A pair of twins: Rev. Hon. Charles Hervey (5 April 1703 – 21 March 1783), prebendary of Ely, and Hon. Henrietta Hervey (5 April 1703 – April 1712)
 A stillborn son, 6 July 1704
 Hon. James Porter Hervey (24 June 1706 – August 1706)
 Lady Anne Hervey (c. 1707 – 15 July 1771)
 Lady Barbara Hervey (c. 1707 – 25 July 1727)
 Hon. Humphrey Hervey (b. 3 June 1708), died young
 Hon. Felton Hervey (3 July 1710 – 16 July 1710)
 Hon. Felton Hervey (1712–1773), MP for the family borough of Bury St Edmunds
 Hon. James Hervey (5 March 1713 – May 1714)
 Lady Louisa Carolina Isabella Hervey (1715 – 11 May 1770), who married Sir Robert Smyth, 2nd Baronet, and had issue
 Lady Henrietta Hervey (25 September 1716 – July 1732)

The countess was described by her friend, Lady Mary Wortley Montagu, as "young, blooming, coquette and gallant", and said that "resolved to make up for time misspent, she has two lovers at a time". She became a Lady of the Bedchamber to the Princess of Wales and future queen, Caroline of Ansbach, in 1714, retaining the position until Caroline's death in 1737.

The countess died four years after the queen and was buried at St Mary's Church, Ickworth, a traditional resting place for the Hervey family.

A portrait of the countess, by John Simon after Michael Dahl, is held by the National Portrait Gallery. She was also painted by Sir Godfrey Kneller.

References

1676 births
1741 deaths
English countesses
Daughters of baronets
Ladies of the Bedchamber
Court of George II of Great Britain
Household of Caroline of Brandenburg-Ansbach